WPHD (98.7 MHz, "Cool Radio") is an FM radio station licensed to serve Corning, New York, United States. The station is owned by Kristin Cantrell's Seven Mountains Media, through licensee Southern Belle, LLC.

It broadcasts a classic hits music format to the Elmira, New York, metropolitan area.

History
This station received its original construction permit from the Federal Communications Commission on July 2, 1987. The new station was assigned the call letters WCBA-FM by the FCC on December 3, 1987. WCBA-FM received its license to cover from the FCC on March 23, 1990.

In April 1990, licensee Dean J. Slack reached an agreement to sell this station to Eolin Broadcasting, Inc. The deal was approved by the FCC on May 21, 1990, and the transaction was consummated on June 8, 1990.

Completing a swap between sister stations where the former WGMM became WCBA-FM (now WCIG) and this station, WCBA-FM's call letters were changed to WGMM-FM by the FCC on May 16, 2005. Just six weeks later, the station was assigned the call sign WGMM by the FCC on June 29, 2005.

In June 2021, WGMM rebranded as "Cool Radio" following the acquisition of the station by Seven Mountains Media. On June 23, 2021, WGMM changed their call letters to WPHD.

Previous logo

References

External links

PHD
Classic hits radio stations in the United States
Steuben County, New York
Radio stations established in 1990
1990 establishments in New York (state)